The Antarctic Convergence or Antarctic Polar Front is a marine belt encircling Antarctica, varying in latitude seasonally, where cold, northward-flowing Antarctic waters meet the relatively warmer waters of the sub-Antarctic. Antarctic waters predominantly sink beneath the warmer subantarctic waters, while associated zones of mixing and upwelling create a zone very high in marine productivity, especially for Antarctic krill.

This line, like the arctic tree line, is a natural boundary rather than an artificial one, such as the borders of nations and time zones. It not only separates two hydrological regions, but also separates areas of distinctive marine life and climates.

The Arctic has no similar boundary because of the large bodies of land contiguous with the northern polar region.

History
The Antarctic Convergence was first crossed by Anthony de la Roché in 1675, and described by Edmond Halley in 1700.

Location
Although the northern boundary varies, for the purposes of the Convention on the Conservation of Antarctic Marine Living Resources 1980, it is defined as "50°S, 0°; 50°S, 30°E; 45°S, 30°E; 45°S, 80°E; 55°S, 80°E; 55°S, 150°E; 60°S, 150°E; 60°S, 50°W; 50°S, 50°W; 50°S, 0°." Although this zone is a mobile one, it usually does not stray more than half a degree of latitude from its mean position.

Subantarctic islands lying north of the Convergence
  Amsterdam Island (France)
  Crozet Islands (France)
  Diego Ramírez Islands (Chile)
  (United Kingdom)
  Isla de los Estados (Argentina)
  Macquarie Island (Australia)
  NZ Subantarctic Islands (New Zealand)
 Antipodes Islands
 Auckland Islands
 Bounty Islands
 Campbell Islands
 Snares Islands
  Prince Edward Islands (South Africa)
  Saint Paul Island (France)
  /  Tierra del Fuego (Argentina / Chile)
  (United Kingdom)
  Gough Island

Islands which lie to the south of the Convergence

North of 60°S latitude 

  (Norway)
  (Australia)
  Kerguelen Islands (France)
  (United Kingdom)

South of 60°S latitude 

  Balleny Islands (Antarctic Treaty System)
  Peter I Island (Antarctic Treaty System)
  Scott Island (Antarctic Treaty System)
  South Orkney Islands (Antarctic Treaty System)
  South Shetland Islands (Antarctic Treaty System)

See also

 Antarctic
 Antarctic Circle
 Antarctic Circumpolar Wave
 Polar front
 Southern Ocean

References

External links
 Map of Antarctic Convergence

Currents of the Southern Ocean